Narendra M Thumbhekodige (also known as Narendra T M or Narendra Manappa or Naren Manappa) is a software engineer, author, chess player and an actor. He is the co-author of the book The Oracle J2EE Companion published by Tata McGraw-Hill in 2004. He received master's degree in Computer science from Indian Institute of Science, Bangalore in 2000. He worked for Oracle for almost seven years in Database security and currently works for Google on Indic technologies.

He also worked with filmstar Upendra as the Creative Director at UppiAds and is into film making as well. He is a former Karnataka state level chess player and also writes daily spiritual quotes at Kuyyo Kuotes. He is the creator of Kannada Search and Kannada Slate.

Books and guides 
 The Oracle J2EE Companion, 2004. Co-author. 
 Oracle Database 10g Security Guide, 2005. Contributor. 
 Oracle Database 11g Security Guide, 2007. Contributor.

Filmography 
 Actor - Supporting role, Uppi Daada MBBS (2005) movie.
 Lyricist - Assisted, Omkara (2004) movie.
 Editor - Assisted, Raktha Kanneeru (2003) and Gokarna (2003) movies.
 Script writer - Assisted, Omkara (2004) movies; Co-wrote, Navaratna Hair Oil (2004) ads.
 Creative Director - Navaratna Hair Oil (2004) ads.

References

External links 
 Filmography
 Navaratna Hair Oil Ads
 Chess Tournaments
 Personal profile
 UppiAds
 Masters Thesis

Google employees
Oracle employees
Businesspeople from Bangalore
Living people
Indian Institute of Science alumni
Year of birth missing (living people)